John J. Madden (born May 4, 1973) is a Canadian former professional ice hockey centre. He played 13 seasons in the National Hockey League (NHL), most prominently for the New Jersey Devils. An undrafted player from the University of Michigan (where he holds the NCAA record for most shorthanded goals in a single season with 10), he won the Stanley Cup three times during his NHL career: twice with the Devils and once with the Chicago Blackhawks. Madden was noted during his career for his ability to kill penalties, play both ends of the ice and score shorthanded goals.

Madden was regarded during his career as one of the league's best defensive forwards; he was awarded the Frank J. Selke Trophy in 2001, and finished second in voting 2003, 2004 and 2008. His penalty-killing skills often generated breakaway chances while his team was shorthanded. Madden led the NHL and set a Devils' team record — and tied the NHL rookie record at the time, held by Gerry Minor (Vancouver Canucks, 1980–81) — by scoring six shorthanded goals during the 1999–2000 season.

After retiring as a player in 2012, he became a coach and scout for NHL teams, including the head coach position for the Columbus Blue Jackets' minor league affiliate, the Cleveland Monsters, for three seasons.

Playing career

Early years
Madden grew up in a public housing project, Parma Court, in Toronto. Madden is a graduate of the Victoria Village House League and has also played for a number of minor league teams, including the Don Mills Flyers, Scarborough Bruins, Hillcrest Summits, and the Junior "C" Alliston Hornets, before moving up to the Junior "B" Barrie Colts.  During his second full season (1992–93) with the Colts, Madden set team records for assists (75) and points (124).

Madden was selected in the 11th round, 173rd overall, in the 1992 OHL Priority Selection by the Niagara Falls Thunder after a 104-point season with the Barrie Colts Jr. B. (OHA) team. Madden did not report to Niagara Falls, instead choosing to pursue an NCAA scholarship. After his second season in Barrie, when he scored 124 points in 43 games, he was still passed over in the 1993 NHL Entry Draft.

However, of the 286 players drafted that year, only 24 have played more career NHL games than the undrafted Madden (as of the end of the 2009–10 NHL season).

Madden played college hockey for the University of Michigan, playing in 160 games and scoring 80 goals and 100 assists for 180 points, with 123 penalty minutes. During his four-year career with the Wolverines, Madden set the NCAA record for most career shorthanded goals (23) and was a member of the 1995–96 championship team. In his final season at Michigan, he was named to both the CCHA First All-Star and NCAA West First All-American Teams. Madden's teammates at Michigan included future NHL players Brendan Morrison, Mike Knuble, Blake Sloan, Marty Turco, Steve Shields, and Bill Muckalt.

The presence of Morrison, the Devils' second-round pick in 1993, proved fortuitous for Madden, whose strong work ethic was noticed by general manager Lou Lamoriello as he monitored Morrison's college development. Lamoriello eventually offered Madden a contract, and he signed with the Devils as an amateur free agent on June 26, 1997.

New Jersey Devils
Madden spent the bulk of his first two professional seasons with the Albany River Rats of the American Hockey League (AHL). He led the River Rats in scoring during the 1998–99 season, setting team records for assists (60) and points (98). He made his NHL debut on January 6, 1999, against cross-town rivals the New York Rangers (one of four games he played for the Devils that season) and collected his first career NHL point on January 18, 1999, against the San Jose Sharks. He won a permanent spot on the Devils' roster the following season (1999–2000) and remained with the team through to the 2008–09 season.

On October 29, 2000, in a 9–0 victory against the Pittsburgh Penguins, Madden and Randy McKay became the first NHL teammates to each score four goals in one game since January 14, 1922. Over his career, Madden had thirty-two 2-point games, three 3-point games, one 4-point game and one 5-point game.

For most of his time with the Devils, Madden was paired with left wing player Jay Pandolfo, prompting many Devils fans to refer to this ubiquitous duo as "Madolfo". The value of the Madden/Pandolfo partnership to the Devils was particularly notable after the 2004–05 NHL lockout.  Despite the loss of defensive stalwarts Scott Stevens (retirement), Scott Niedermayer (free agency), and Ken Daneyko (retirement), as well as a series of rule changes designed to increase offence, the Devils have remained one of the NHL's least scored on and least penalized teams.

On April 25, 2006, Madden completed his first career playoff hat-trick in a 4–1 win over the New York Rangers; two of his goals were shorthanded, tying an NHL record.

Madden was a member of the Devils' 1999–2000 and 2002–03 Stanley Cup champion clubs. After the retirement of long-time captain Scott Stevens before the 2005–06 season, the Devils abandoned the use of the captain's "C" and instead used four alternate captains, drawing from a pool of Madden, Brian Rafalski, Colin White, Scott Gomez, Alexander Mogilny and Patrik Eliáš. Madden continued to wear the alternate captain's "A", except for a short time in the 2007–08 season, in which the "A" was given to Brian Gionta, Dainius Zubrus and Patrik Eliáš (Eliáš, after having the captaincy taken away). Once Jamie Langenbrunner, on December 5, 2007 was named captain, Madden once again was assigned the "A", along with defenseman Colin White.

Madden scored his 100th career goal (regular season) on April 1, 2006, against the Philadelphia Flyers.  Other career milestones included his 100th assist (October 18, 2006, against the Pittsburgh Penguins), 200th point (October 12, 2006, against the Toronto Maple Leafs), and 500th game (November 17, 2006, against the Ottawa Senators).

Chicago Blackhawks
As an unrestricted free agent on July 1, 2009, Madden signed a one-year contract with the Chicago Blackhawks worth $2.75 million. He won his third Stanley Cup with the Blackhawks that year.

Minnesota Wild
On August 6, 2010, Madden signed a one-year contract with the Minnesota Wild. While Madden scored 12 goals and 25 points in 76 games, the Wild failed to qualify for the playoffs.

Florida Panthers
On January 4, 2012, Madden signed a one-year contract with the Florida Panthers, joining former Blackhawks teammates Kris Versteeg, Brian Campbell and Tomáš Kopecký and former Devils teammate Scott Clemmensen. The Panthers clinched the playoffs for the first time in twelve years. Madden, however, recorded no points during the playoffs as they lost the first round to his former team, the New Jersey Devils, in seven games. 

Madden officially retired from the NHL on September 4, 2012.

Post-retirement and coaching career
On September 4, 2012, Madden retired from the NHL. The same day, he accepted a position with the Montreal Canadiens amateur player recruitment group for scouting and evaluating amateur free agent talent in American college hockey.

On November 8, 2013, Peter Horachek was named interim head coach for the Florida Panthers and hired Madden as an assistant coach. Madden would stay with the team as an assistant after under head coach Gerard Gallant. Madden was fired by the Panthers on May 13, 2016.

On August 29, 2016, Madden was named the head coach of the Cleveland Monsters, the AHL affiliate of the Columbus Blue Jackets. Madden replaced Jared Bednar, who had coached the team to winning the league championship the previous season before being hired as the head coach of the Colorado Avalanche. He coached the Monsters for three seasons and a 101–99–4–4 record before leaving the team.

Madden joined the San Jose Sharks as an assistant coach on September 22, 2020. He was relieved of his duties on July 1, 2022.

On July 26th 2022, Madden joined the Arizona Coyotes as an assistant coach.

Personal life
Madden and his wife Lauren have two children, Tyler and Reese. On June 23, 2018, Tyler Madden was drafted 68th overall by the Vancouver Canucks in the 2018 NHL Entry Draft and was traded from the Canucks to the Los Angeles Kings in the 2019–20 season.

Career statistics

Awards and honours

References

External links

1973 births
Living people
Albany River Rats players
Canadian ice hockey centres
Chicago Blackhawks players
Florida Panthers coaches
Florida Panthers players
Frank Selke Trophy winners
HIFK (ice hockey) players
Ice hockey people from Toronto
Michigan Wolverines men's ice hockey players
Minnesota Wild players
Montreal Canadiens scouts
New Jersey Devils players
Stanley Cup champions
Undrafted National Hockey League players
Canadian expatriate ice hockey players in Finland
Canadian ice hockey coaches
NCAA men's ice hockey national champions
AHCA Division I men's ice hockey All-Americans